Karbala (also Romanized as Karbalā) is a village in Piveshk Rural District, Lirdaf District, Jask County, Hormozgan Province, Iran. At the 2006 census, its population was 226, in 46 families.

See also 
 Karbala, the city in Iraq

References 

Populated places in Jask County